Begonia is a rural locality in the Maranoa Region, Queensland, Australia. In the  Begonia had a population of 50 people.

Geography 
The Maranoa River flows from north-west to south-east through the locality.

History 
Begonia State School opened on 25 January 1970.

In the  Begonia had a population of 50 people.

Education 
Begonia State School is a government co-educational primary school (P-6) at 4233 Begonia Road. In 2016, the school had an enrolment of 14 students with 3 teachers (1 full-time equivalent) and 4 non-teaching staff (1 full-time equivalent).

References 

Maranoa Region
Localities in Queensland